The Xbox 360 Lounge was a venue in Aoyama, Tokyo, close to the upscale Omotesandō, Tokyo shopping area. It was opened on November 1, 2005, to boost Xbox 360 awareness in Japan, several weeks before the Xbox 360 release on November 22, 2005.

The lounge was composed of three main areas: a 256 m2 event space equipped with five large display screens, an area containing Xbox 360 game kiosks, and a 70-seat café. It was open daily from November 1, 2005, to February 12, 2006.

Opening Night
Microsoft gathered many Japanese celebrities to kick off opening night. They got celebrities from both inside and outside the game industry, to open the doors to the Xbox 360 Lounge on Monday evening.

The night kicked off at 7:00PM. Afro arrived nearly an hour late, but still managed to make it in time for the arrival of the night's stars. Big-name game creators like Keiji Inafune (Capcom), Yuji Naka (Sega), Hideo Kojima (Konami), Yoichi Okamoto (Game Republic) and Hiromichi Tanaka (Square Enix) took the stage first and gave brief statements about the X360. Naka stated "I hope the industry is spurred by the appearance of the Xbox 360," with Kojima simply stating "I've been waiting!"

The assembled television camera crews seemed a bit more interested in the stars Microsoft had lined up for the event, though. Many of the stars are big in Japan but unknown in America: Hitomi Nagasawa, Ishikawa Asami, Kazuhi Sakuraba (the Pride fighter), Otoha (future Gaming Life in Japan young idol). Olympic swimmer Kousuke Kitajima, when clued in on the fact that there aren't any swimming games, pointed out that it's hard to make such a game because you can't see the swimmer's face. Many of these stars, including track & field star Dai Tamesue, had designed a face plate.

References

Lounge